Chalcolampra is a genus of leaf beetles (insects contained in the family Chrysomelidae). These beetles are widespread from Southeast Asia to Australia and New Zealand, but most common in the southeast of Australia.
There are approximately 25 Australian species within this genus. There are also 13 species described from New Zealand, with up to an additional 20 undescribed species from the South Island.

Species
The genus contains the following species:

 Chalcolampra adelioides Lea, 1903
 Chalcolampra aenea (Boisduval, 1835)
 Chalcolampra chalybeata Baly, 1855
 Chalcolampra consimilis Lea, 1903
 Chalcolampra constricta (Erichson, 1842)
 Chalcolampra crassa (Broun, 1915)
 Chalcolampra distinguenda Blackburn, 1889
 Chalcolampra fulvomontis Reid, 1993
 Chalcolampra fuscipes (Broun, 1917)
 Chalcolampra laticollis Clark, 1865
 Chalcolampra limbata (Broun, 1893)
 Chalcolampra longicornis Lea, 1929
 Chalcolampra marginata (Sharp, 1882)
 Chalcolampra marmorata Baly, 1865
 Chalcolampra media (Broun, 1917)
 Chalcolampra morosa (Broun, 1893)
 Chalcolampra multinoda Reid, 1993
 Chalcolampra nigricollis (Broun, 1917)
 Chalcolampra pacifica (Erichson, 1842)
 Chalcolampra pallida Weise, 1923
 Chalcolampra picticornis Broun, 1917
 Chalcolampra praestans (Broun, 1917)
 Chalcolampra pustulata Baly, 1855
 Chalcolampra repens (Germar, 1848)
 Chalcolampra robusta (Broun, 1917)
 Chalcolampra rufinoda Lea, 1904
 Chalcolampra rufipes Jacoby, 1885
 Chalcolampra rustica Blackburn, 1890
 Chalcolampra speculifera Sharp, 1882
 Chalcolampra subsulcata (Broun, 1917)
 Chalcolampra tarsalis (Broun, 1917)
 Chalcolampra thoracica Baly, 1855
 Chalcolampra walgalu Reid, 1993
 Chalcolampra winnunga (Daccordi, 2003)

References

Beetles of Asia
Beetles of Australia
Beetles of New Zealand
Chrysomelidae genera
Chrysomelinae
Taxa named by Émile Blanchard